"Callin' Me" is a song by American rapper Lil' Zane featuring R&B group 112. It was released as the first single from his debut studio album Young World: The Future on June 6, 2000, and was produced by Diggie Doms and Mistafiss.

The song topped the Hot Rap Songs chart for 6 consecutive weeks beginning on July 15, 2000, and peaked at number 8 on the Billboard Hot Rap Songs chart and number 21 on the Hot 100 chart.

Chart performance
"Callin' Me" peaked at number 21 on the Billboard Hot 100 for the week of September 2, 2000, staying on the chart for thirteen weeks. It topped the Hot Rap Songs chart for six weeks, beginning for the week of July 15, 2000. It remained on the charts for 31 weeks. The song also debuted at number 8 on the Hot R&B/Hip-Hop songs chart for the week of September 2, 2000.

Formats and track listing

CD
1. "Callin' Me" (Radio Edit) – 3:45
2. "Callin' Me" (Album version) – 4:20
3. "Callin' Me" (Instrumental) – 4:20

CD (Promo)
1. "Callin' Me" (Radio Edit) – 3:45
2. "Callin' Me" (Instrumental) – 4:20

12"
A1. "Main Mix" – 4:20
B1. "Radio Version" – 3:45
B2. "Instrumental" – 4:20

Charts

Weekly charts

Year-end charts

References

2000 singles
112 (band) songs
2000 songs